Pornography in France is legal with restrictions. Softcore pornography is restricted to people 16 and over, and hardcore pornography is not allowed to be sold to minors under 18. Violent or graphic pornography rated X and so are not allowed for display to minors, and are shown in specific theatres. Some pornography has a special VAT: a 33% tax is levied on X-rated movies, and a 50% excise is placed on pornographic online services.

Parental controls
A mandatory age control for pornographic websites has been approved by the French government, in order to prevent minors from accessing pornographic content. The average age for an individual first being exposed to pornography is 13. During a speech at UNESCO, French president Emmanuel Macron said: “We do not take a 13-year-old boy to a sex-shop, not anything goes in the digital world." Some children, however, have first consumed pornography as early as 8. Macron warned that websites will be given a period of six months for parental control to be set up by default, and if not, a law for automatic parental control will be passed. According to Metacert, there are currently 5.5 million pornographic websites in France alone. Macron also started that "sexuality is built on stereotypes."

Child pornography
Child pornography is illegal in France. The maximum penalty for using and distributing child pornography is 5 years imprisonment and a €75,000 fine.

Film and pornography
The rating system has caused controversy. In 2000, the sexually explicit and violent film Baise-moi was initially rated only as "restricted" by the French government. This classification was overturned by a Conseil d'État ruling in a lawsuit brought by associations supporting Christian and family values.

Some movies are forbidden to minors under 18, without the X-rating, like Baise-moi, Ken Park and Saw 3, so that these movies can be viewed in theaters and not attract VAT.

Sexual abuse

The French pornography industry systematically uses violence against women. According to a report Hell behind the scenes presented by four French senators Annick Billon, Laurence Rossignol, Alexandra Borchio-Fontimp and Laurence Cohen.

They also argued for proper judicial process about this matter.

See also

 Marquis de Sade

References

French pornography